Paul Arthur Bennett (March 22, 1897 – December 18, 1966) was an American typographer and author.

Biography 
Paul Arthur Bennett was born in Brooklyn on March 22, 1897. He enlisted in the U.S. Army at 19, near the end of World War I. He served overseas from November 1918 to June 1919.

Bennett was director of typography for the Mergenthaler Linotype Company in the USA for 30 years before his retirement in 1962. Other clients included Fuller-Smith, Dunlop-Ward, the Chandler Motor Company. He wrote several papers, monographs, and keepsakes for The Typophiles, and also edited the book Books and Printing (1951). Bennett was a leading member of the Typophiles Society in New York City.

He died in his home in Jackson Heights, Queens.

References 

1897 births
1966 deaths
AIGA medalists
American typographers and type designers
Writers from Brooklyn
People from Jackson Heights, Queens
American military personnel of World War I